Erin Healy is an American politician. She has served as a South Dakota Democratic Party member in the South Dakota House of Representatives since 2019 from district 10. Healy serves as one of eleven Democratic members of the South Dakota Legislature.

Career

2018 election season 
In 2018, Healy ran for one of two South Dakota House of Representative seats in district 14. She ran against incumbents, Larry Zikmund and Tom Holmes, On November 6, 2018, Healy won the election along with Larry Zikmund.

2019–2020 legislative session 
On January 5, 2019, Healy was sworn in at the South Dakota capitol building. She was chosen as the House Minority Whip along with Oren Lesmeister. For the 2019 legislative session she served as a member of the House Education and House Health and Human Services Committees. In that session, Healy prime sponsored four bills and co-sponsored forty-one. For the 2020 legislative session, she again served as a member of the House Education and House Health and Human Services Committees. In that session, Healy prime sponsored seven bills and co-sponsored thirty-three.

2020 election season 
In 2020, Healy ran for re-election against fellow Democrat, Mike Huber, and Republicans Taylor Rehfeldt and Tom Holmes in district 14. One day after the general election on November 4, 2020, Healy officially won re-election along with new member Taylor Rehfeldt.

2021 and 2022 legislative session 
Healy's second term as a member of the South Dakota House of Representatives began on January 12, 2021. For the 2021 legislative session, she served as a member of the House Education and House Health and Human Services Committees. Healy also served as a member of the House Legislative Procedure and Joint Legislative Procedure Committees. In this session, she prime-sponsored six bills and co-sponsored seventeen bills. For the 2022 legislative session Healy again served as a member of the House Education, House Health and Human Services, House Legislative Procedure, and Joint Legislative Procedure Committees. In this session, she prime-sponsored four bills and co-sponsored seventeen bills.

2022 election season 
In 2022, Healy ran for the South Dakota House of Representatives in district 10. In the election, she ran against fellow Democrat Kameron Nelson, and Republicans John Mogen and Tom Sutton. On November 8, 2022, Healy won re-election to the South Dakota House of Representatives along with new member Kameron Nelson.

2023 legislative session 
Healy's third term as a member of the South Dakota House of Representatives began on January 10, 2023. She was chosen as the House Assistant Minority Leader. For the 2023 legislative session, Healy served as a member of the House Health and Human Services and House State Affairs Committees. She also served as a member of the House Legislative Procedure and Joint Legislative Procedure Committees. As of February 5, 2023, Healy has prime-sponsored five bills and co-sponsored thirty-two bills.

References

External links

Date of birth missing (living people)
Living people
Women state legislators in South Dakota
Democratic Party members of the South Dakota House of Representatives
21st-century American women politicians
21st-century American politicians
Year of birth missing (living people)